L.A. Live is an entertainment complex in the South Park District of Downtown Los Angeles, California. It is adjacent to the Crypto.com Arena and Los Angeles Convention Center.

L.A. Live was developed by Anschutz Entertainment Group (AEG), Wachovia Corp, Azteca Corp, investment firm MacFarlane Partners, and with tax deferments paid by Los Angeles taxpayers. The architectural firm responsible for the master plan and phase two buildings was Baltimore-based RTKL Associates.

With the adjoining LA Convention Center and Crypto.com Arena, LA Live will be part of the "Downtown Sports Park" cluster for the upcoming 2028 Olympic Games being held in Los Angeles. LA Live will host boxing events at Microsoft Theater.

Timeline
Initial construction at L.A. Live began in September 2005. The first phase opened in October 2007 and contained Microsoft Theatre, the Xbox Plaza, a retail plaza, as well as an underground parking garage, holding a fraction of the project's expected total of 4,000 parking spaces.

LA live was initially decried by architects as not being openly pleasing to the neighborhood streets and a metal looking fortress when it opened. The architect Nate Cherry of CallisonRTKL, the designer of the project wanted to create narrow walkways to lure visitors into the plaza from the street, thus creating alleyways lined with restaurant, similar to a European style public plaza.

LA Live brought in a renaissance to the neighborhood surrounding Crypto.com Arena and billions in economic activity to downtown Los Angeles. Thru the years, the success of LA LIVE! has created mirrored versions or renovations of districts adjacent to sports venues, including TEXAS LIVE in Arlington, Texas, KEMBA Live! at the Arena District in Columbus, Ohio, Kansas City Live! in Kansas City, Missouri, Titletown District in Green Bay, Wisconsin, Patriot Place outside of Gillette Stadium in Massachusetts, and the American Dream Meadowlands near Meadowlands Stadium in New Jersey.

Explored expansion
In 2020, AEG proposed a $1.2-billion public-private partnership that would add as much as 700,000 square feet to the convention center, which AEG operates, and a $700-million, 861-room addition to the JW Marriott hotel.Plans were approved in 2022. Three years of construction is scheduled. 

For a time prior to the return of the Los Angeles Rams in 2016, plans were being developed for the NFL to return to Los Angeles with a new stadium on the campus, to be called Farmers Field. The Los Angeles City Council approved a non-binding memorandum of understanding (MOU) with AEG in a 12–0 vote on August 9, 2011. AEG abandoned the project in March 2015, after the three most likely NFL teams all proposed their own stadium plans in the event they were to relocate to Los Angeles.

Features
L.A. Live has  of ballrooms, bars, concert theatres, restaurants, movie theaters, and a 54-story hotel and condominium tower on a  site. The complex became home to AEG and the Herbalife headquarters in 2008.

Event Deck
The west outdoor parking garage, top level roof is used as event space, called "Event Deck". The 90,000 square foot roof has no obstruction pilers and can easily accommodate large scale tents and platforms. It was used for the 63rd Annual Grammy Awards the 73rd Primetime Emmy Awards during the COVID-19 pandemic as they could accommodate an indoor and outdoor setting for safety protocol. Also used for the world premiers of the Hunger Games franchise and other Hollywood afterparties. The event space can hold up to 5,000 guests.

Xbox Plaza
Xbox Plaza (formally Microsoft Square) is a  open-air plaza that serves as the central meeting place for L.A. Live. The Square provides a broadcast venue featuring giant LED screens as well as a red carpet site for special events. Xbox Plaza hosted the first WWE SummerSlam Axxess event on the weekend beginning August 22, 2009, leading up to the 2009 SummerSlam event on August 23 at Staples Center. On June 24, 2010, the Square was the location for the official red carpet premiere of The Twilight Saga: Eclipse among other world premieres. The 2022 Major League Baseball All-Star Game red carpet was held at the plaza.

Microsoft Theater and The Novo

Microsoft Theater (previously the Nokia Theatre before June 2015) is a music and theatre venue seating 7,100, and The Novo (previous Club Nokia) is a smaller venue with a seating capacity of 2,300 for live music and cultural events.

The theatre has hosted the ESPY Awards since 2008,American Music Awards, Primetime Emmys, Radio Disney Awards, Billboard Music Awards  and other leading ceremonies in the entertainment business., The theater is so commonly used, on March 11, 2008, the Academy of Television Arts and Sciences announced with AEG that the venue would be the home to the Primetime Emmy Awards ceremony from 2008 onward.

The venue has also hosted the finale of the seventh, eighth and ninth seasons of American Idol. The 2010 MTV Video Music Awards were held at Microsoft Theater on September 12, 2010.

The first scheduled event held at Microsoft Theatre was a concert featuring The Eagles and The Dixie Chicks on October 18, 2007. Recording artist John Mayer's live album Where the Light Is: John Mayer Live in Los Angeles was recorded at the Microsoft Theatre.

Grammy Museum

On May 8, 2007, it was announced that the National Academy of Recording Arts and Sciences would establish a museum dedicated to the history of the Grammy Awards. The museum opened in December 2008 for the Grammy Awards 50th anniversary. It consists of four floors with historical music artifacts. It has featured a number of exhibits, including the John Lennon Songwriter Exhibit, which was open from October 4, 2010, to March 31, 2011. 
Embedded on the sidewalks at the LA Live streets are bronze disks, similar to the Hollywood Walk of Fame, honoring each year's top winners, Record of the Year, Best New Artist, Album of the Year, and Song of the Year.

Hotels and residences
The centerpiece of the district is a 54-story, 1,001-room two-hotel hybrid tower, constructed above the parking lot directly north of the Crypto.com Arena. Designed by Gensler and built by Webcor Builders, the skyscraper contains both an 879-room JW Marriott hotel on floors 3–21 and a 123-room Ritz-Carlton hotel on floors 22–26. Floors 27–52 hold 224 Residences at the Ritz Carlton condominiums. The tower's architectural design evolves from a "geometric pattern of glittering, blue-tinted glass." Thirty-four different types of glass were installed to create the uniquely patterned facade. Groundbreaking for the tower took place in June 2007. The project was completed in the first quarter of 2010.

In July 2014, Marriott Hotels opened a second two-hotel hybrid tower with 393 rooms just north across Olympic Boulevard with a Marriott Courtyard and a Residence Inn.

ESPN broadcasting studios
The second phase of development included a  ESPN broadcasting studio, as well as an ESPN Zone restaurant built on the corner of Figueroa Street and Chick Hearn Court. In an effort to expand coverage of West Coast sports, ESPN began broadcasting the 1 AM ET (10 PM PT) edition of SportsCenter from the studio on April 6, 2009. The ESPN Zone restaurant closed in July 2013 and was replaced by Tom's Urban 24, Smashburger and Live Basil Pizza restaurants.

Regal Cinemas
The $100 million, Regal Entertainment Group movie complex opened in 2009 and includes 14 screens and 3,772 seats. It includes a three-story art-deco-style atrium and an 806-seat theater called the "Regal Premiere House" intended for "lucrative" premieres. The theater complex became the West Coast flagship location for Regal, at the time of its opening,  the largest theater chain in the United States. The Michael Jackson film This Is It was the opening film at the theater.

Restaurants
L.A. Live is also host to a set of mid- to upper-scale dining including Fleming's Prime Steakhouse & Wine Bar, Katsuya, Lawry's, Rock'N Fish, Rosa Mexicana, Cleo, Wolfgang Puck Bar & Grill, and Yard House.

Construction gallery

See also

 List of tallest buildings in Los Angeles
 Wilshire Grand Center
 Crypto.com Arena
 Oceanwide Plaza
 Grand Avenue Project
 Ovation Hollywood
 Dolby Theatre
 Park Fifth Towers
 List of music venues in Los Angeles

References

External links
 L.A. Live official website
 Microsoft Theater website
 Smarter Places: RTKL architects
 The Residences at The Ritz-Carlton, Los Angeles
 Los Angeles Sports Council 
 Staples Center official website

 
Downtown Los Angeles
Entertainment districts in California
Music venues in Los Angeles
Sports venues in Los Angeles
Nokia
Condo hotels in the United States
Apartment buildings in Los Angeles
Residential skyscrapers in Los Angeles
Tourist attractions in Los Angeles
JW Marriott Hotels
The Ritz-Carlton Hotel Company
RTKL Associates buildings
2000s architecture in the United States
Skyscraper hotels in Los Angeles